Saugatuck is a census-designated place (CDP) in the town of Westport, Fairfield County, Connecticut, United States. It is in the southwest part of the town, on both sides of the Saugatuck River, extending south to where it enters Long Island Sound. North of Interstate 95, it occupies just the west side of the Saugatuck and continues north as far as U.S. Route 1 (Post Road). It is bordered to the north by Westport Village (the town center) and to the west by the city of Norwalk. The CDP includes the communities of Owenoke and Saugatuck Shores, as well as the Metro-North Railroad Westport station.

Saugatuck was first listed as a CDP prior to the 2020 census.

References 

Census-designated places in Fairfield County, Connecticut
Census-designated places in Connecticut